Cicindela elegantula is a species of tiger beetle native to Thailand and other parts of Southeast Asia.

References

elegantula
Insects of Thailand
Beetles described in 1882